"Do You Love Me" is a 1962 hit song by The Contours.

Do You Love Me may also refer to:

Film and television
 Do You Love Me (film), a 1946 film starring Maureen O'Hara
 "Do You Love Me?" (Neon Genesis Evangelion)
 "Do You Love Me?", an episode of the 2006 TV series Robin Hood

Music
 Do You Love Me (Now That I Can Dance), an album by The Contours

Songs
 "Do You Love Me?" (Fiddler on the Roof), a song from the 1964 Broadway musical Fiddler on the Roof
 Do You Love Me?, a song by Sherif Dean.
 "Do You Love Me" (Patti Austin song), 1981
 "(Do You Love Me) Just Say Yes", a song by Highway 101 from their 1988 album 101²
 "Do You Love Me?" (Nick Cave and the Bad Seeds song), 1994
 "Do You Love Me?" (Amanda Jenssen song), 2008
 "Do You Love Me" (2NE1 song), 2013
 "Do You Love Me" (Jay Sean song), 2017
 "Do You Love Me", a song by Chuck Berry first released on Chuck Berry's Golden Decade Volume 3
 "Do You Love Me?", a song by Kiss from their 1976 album Destroyer
 "Do You Love Me", a song written by Maceo Parker and Michael Rucska on Maceo Parker's 1991 album Funk Overload
 "Do you love me?", a song from the 1997 video game Beatmania 2ndMIX by Reo Nagumo
 "Do You Love Me?", a song by Guster from their 2010 album Easy Wonderful
 "Do You Love Me", a song from a 2020 film of Baaghi 3.

See also
 
Restoration of Peter